The 2017 season is Haugesund's 8th season in the Tippeligaen following their promotion in 2009.

Squad

Transfers

Winter

In:

Out:

Summer

In:

Out:

Competitions

Eliteserien

Results summary

Results by round

Results

Table

Norwegian Cup

UEFA Europa League

Qualifying rounds

Squad statistics

Appearances and goals

|-
|colspan="14"|Players away from Haugesund on loan:

|-
|colspan="14"|Players who left Haugesund during the season:

|}

Goal scorers

Disciplinary record

References

FK Haugesund seasons
Haugesund